The Kentucky Space Grant Consortium (KSGC) is a partnership between Kentucky and NASA. Projects include the University of Kentucky's Big Blue, Kentucky Space, and Northern Kentucky University's Moon Buggy Project.

See also 
National Space Grant College and Fellowship Program

External links 

Educational organizations based in the United States
Non-profit organizations based in Kentucky
NASA programs
University of Kentucky